Filicrisia is a genus of bryozoans belonging to the family Crisiidae. It was first described in 1853 by Alcide d'Orbigny, and the type species is Filicrisia geniculata.

The genus has almost cosmopolitan distribution.

Species:

Filicrisia allooeciata 
Filicrisia franciscana 
Filicrisia geniculata 
Filicrisia neocomiensis 
Filicrisia smitti

References

External links
Filicrisia occurrence data & images from GBIF

Bryozoan genera
Taxa named by Alcide d'Orbigny
Taxa described in 1853